The 2015 Military Bowl was a post-season American college football bowl game played on December 28, 2015 at Navy–Marine Corps Memorial Stadium in Annapolis, Maryland. The eighth edition of the Military Bowl featured the Pittsburgh Panthers of the Atlantic Coast Conference against the hometown Navy Midshipmen of the American Athletic Conference. It began at 2:30 p.m. EST and aired on ESPN.  It was one of the 2015–16 bowl games that concluded the 2015 FBS football season.  Sponsored by aerospace and defense technology company Northrop Grumman, it was officially known as the Military Bowl presented by Northrop Grumman.

Teams
The game featured the Pittsburgh Panthers against the Navy Midshipmen.

Navy Midshipmen

On September 14, 2015, it was announced that Navy would play in the Military Bowl should they be bowl-eligible and not selected for one of the New Year's Six bowl games.  After compiling a 9–2 record in their regular season and losing to Houston in their American Athletic Conference finale, the Midshipmen automatically qualified for the game.

This will be the Midshipmen's second Military Bowl, after the inaugural 2008 game (when it was known as the EagleBank Bowl) where they lost to Wake Forest by a score of 29–19.

Pittsburgh Panthers

The Panthers are heading to their eighth straight bowl game, the longest such streak in school history. First-year head coach Pat Narduzzi led the Panthers to an 8–4 record and a 2nd-place finish in the ACC Coastal division. Pittsburgh is 13–18 all-time in bowl games.

Game summary

Scoring summary

Statistics

References

Military Bowl
Military Bowl
Navy Midshipmen football bowl games
Pittsburgh Panthers football bowl games
December 2015 sports events in the United States
Military Bowl